Cinema of Argentina refers to the film industry based in Argentina. The Argentine cinema comprises the art of film and creative movies made within the nation of Argentina or by Argentine filmmakers abroad.

The Argentine film industry has historically been one of the three most developed in Latin American cinema, along with those produced in Mexico and Brazil. Throughout the 20th century, film production in Argentina, supported by the State and by the work of a long list of directors and actors, became one of the major film industries in the Spanish-speaking world.

Argentina has won eighteen Goya Awards for Best Spanish Language Foreign Film, which makes it the most awarded country. It is also the first Latin American country that has won Academy Awards, in recognition of the films The Official Story (1985) and The Secret in Their Eyes (2009).

History

The beginning

In 1896, French photographer Eugene Py was working for the Belgian Henri Lepage and the Austrian Max Glücksmann at the 'Casa Lepage', a photographic supplies business in Buenos Aires. The three all saw the debut of the Lumière Cinématographe in Argentina,"with a picture of the Lumiére's, took place on 18 July 1896" at the Teatro Odéon, only a year after its debut in Paris.

Lepage then imported the first French cinematographic equipment into the country and though Eugenio Py who, using a Gaumont camera in 1897, is often credited for the first Argentine film, La Bandera Argentina (which consisted of a flag of Argentina waving in the wind at the Plaza de Mayo), the credit belongs to German-Brazilian Federico Figner, who screened the first three Argentine films on 24 November 1896 (shorts depicting sights of Buenos Aires). Earning renown, Py continued to produce films for exhibition at the Casa Lepage for several years, following up with Viaje del Doctor Campos Salles a Buenos Aires (1900, considered the country's first documentary) and La Revista de la Escuadra Argentina (1901); by that time, the first projection halls had opened, working as part of the cross-national film production, distribution and exhibition system developed by Glücksmann in Argentina, Uruguay and Chile.

Early developments

Several Argentine artists continued to experiment with the new invention, making news shorts and documentaries. Eugenio A. Cardini filmed Escenas Callejeras (1901) and Mario Gallo made the first Argentine film with a point-of-view: El fusilamiento de Dorrego ("Dorrego's Execution," 1908). Other directors such as Ernesto Gunche directed early documentaries.

The Argentine history and literature provided the themes of the first years of film-making. One of the first successes of the national cinema was Nobleza Gaucha of 1915, inspired by Martín Fierro, the gaucho poem by José Hernández. Based on José Mármol's novel, Amalia was the first full-length movie of national production, and in 1917 El Apóstol, a satiric short on president Hipólito Yrigoyen, became the first animated feature film in world cinema. Another notable 1917 debut, for Francisco Defilippis Novoa's Flor de durazno, was Carlos Gardel.

Directors such as José A. Ferreyra began to work on producing films in Argentine cinema, releasing films such as Palomas rubias (1920), La Gaucha (1921) and Buenos Aires, ciudad de ensueño in 1922. Films that followed included La Maleva, Corazón de criolla, Melenita de oro, Leyenda del puente inca (1923), Odio serrano, Mientras Buenos Aires duerme, Arriero de Yacanto (1924) and El Organito de la tarde and Mi último tango (1925).

In 1926, Ferreyra released La Vuelta al Bulín, La Costurerita que dio aquel mal paso and Muchachita de Chiclana followed by Perdón, viejita (1927). Many of these Ferreyra films featured two of the decade's most popular stars, Alvaro Escobar and Elena Guido.

Towards the end of the decade, directors such as Julio Irigoyen began to release films such as Alma en pena in 1928. Films such as these began to feature the Argentine culture of tango dancing into films, something which rocketed later in the 1930s after the advent of sound.

1930s–1950s: The Golden Age

List of Argentine films:1930s
In 1930, Adiós Argentina became the first Argentine film to have a soundtrack. The film was written and directed by Mario Parpagnoli for Cinematográfica Valle and finished in December 1929. The film starred actresses such as Libertad Lamarque and Ada Cornaro who both debuted in the film.

In 1931, José A. Ferreyra directed Muñequitas porteñas, the first Argentine film to be made with Vitaphone sound synchronisation. That year, Ferreyra made a second sound film, El Cantar de mi ciudad, encouraging other early directors to make the transition to sound.

Movietone arrived in 1933 and it allowed both voice and music in motion pictures. The first two Argentine cinematographic studios were created: Argentina Sono Film was founded by Ángel Mentasti; Lumitón was created by a partnership led by Enrique Susini, who was instrumental in the introduction of television to Argentina in 1951. Susini created a hub for audiovisual development. He launched the film "Los tres berretines" which was the first Argentinian film with a plot and a spoken script.  

The first disc-less sound film was ¡Tango! (1933), directed by Luis Maglia Barth and a key film of the period was the tango film Dancing which saw the birth of a number of Argentine stars such as Amelia Bence and Tito Lusiardo; other popular actors from the era included Aida Alberti, Armando Bo, Floren Delbene and Arturo García Buhr. Two such features which have endured in local culture are Honeysuckle, starring Libertad Lamarque and Casamiento en Buenos Aires, starring Niní Marshall. The two 1939 films each featured themes that have become Argentine musical standards, likewise immortalizing the two leading ladies.

Other films included: El alma del bandoneón, Mario Soffici, 1935; La muchacha de a bordo, Manuel Romero, 1936; Ayúdame a vivir, 1936 by Ferreyra; Besos brujos (1937) by Ferreyra; La vuelta al nido (Leopoldo Torres Rios, 1938) and Asi es la vida (1939) directed by Francisco Mugica.

Manuel Romero was a prominent director of the mid-to-late 1930s and worked in comedy based films often with rising Argentine star Luis Sandrini in films such as Don Quijote del altillo. Romero was also a tango lyricist, one of the creators of magazine theatre and playwright that wrote more than 180 plays. He directed more than 50 films in total, most of which based on his own plot and composed the music with a tango film. 

The film industry in Argentina reached a pinnacle in the late 1930s and 1940s when an average of forty-two films were produced annually. The films usually included tango, but even when a tango theme was omitted most cinema from this period still included humble heroes and wealthy villains. In these films, it portrayed hard work and poverty as ennobling and depicted the poor as the primary beneficiaries of Juan Perón's economic policies. These films, in part supported by Perón, were seen as part of the political agenda of peronism. By supporting a film industry that attacked greed and supported the working class, Perón was able to influence the attitudes of his constituency to build public appeal.

The growing popularity of the cinema of the United States, pressure from the Roman Catholic Church and increasing censorship during the Perón presidency limited the growth of Argentine cinema somewhat, not least because harassment led to the exile of a number of prominent actors, among them Alberto de Mendoza, Arturo García Buhr, Niní Marshall and Libertad Lamarque, whose rivalry with her colleague Eva Duarte turned against her when the latter became First Lady in 1946. Argentine cinema began losing viewership as foreign titles gained an increasing foothold in the Argentine market. The problem eventually became so bad that Argentina tried to curb the influx with the Cinema Law of 1957, establishing the "Instituto Nacional de Cinematografía" to provide education and funding.

Among the era's most successful films were: Historia de una noche, Luis Saslavsky, 1941; La dama duende, Luis Saslavsky, 1945; Malambro (Lucas Demare and Hugo Fregonese, 1945); Albeniz (Luis César Amadori) starring Pedro López Lagar (1947); Pelota de trapo (1948) and Crimen de Oribe (1950), Leopoldo Torres Ríos; and Las aguas bajan turbias, by Hugo del Carril, 1952. One of the few Argentine actors who made a successful transition into directing was Mario Soffici, who debuted behind the camera in 1935 to acclaim with El alma del bandoneón and went on to become an institution in Argentine film over the next generation; among his most memorable work was the film adaptation of Marco Denevi's bestselling mystery, Rosaura a la diez ("Rosaura at Ten O'Clock"), for whose 1958 screen release Soffici wrote, directed and starred.

In 1958, the film Thunder Among the Leaves directed by Armando Bó was released. The film featured the later sex-symbol Isabel Sarli in her first starring role, and marked the beginning of her partnership with future husband Armando Bó, which would span almost three decades and made numerous sexploitation films. Now considered a classic, a scene in which she bathes in a lake was the first one to feature full frontal nudity in Argentine cinema. The film was a highly controversial box-office success; it has been described as a "boom" and "scandalous" and shocked the mostly Catholic Argentine society. In November 1958, The News and Courier reported "[a] saucy Latin lass has smashed South American box office records with the most daring dunking since Hedy Lamarr disrobed to fame in Ecstasy." The movie's premiere in Montevideo, Uruguay broke box office records, and Sarli's bath scene "rocked some Latin American capitals". However, Sarli was panned by fellow filmmakers for the nude scene.

The horror genre, little explored by Argentine film-makers, was explored by Argentine director Narciso Ibáñez Menta.

Television, as in the United States, began to exert pressure on the film market in the 1950s; on the air since the 1951 launch of Channel 7 (public television), Argentine television programming is the oldest in Latin America.

First "New Cinema"

Since the late 1950s a new generation of film directors took Argentine films to international film festivals. The first wave of such directors was Leopoldo Torre-Nilsson, who "explored aristocratic decadence", Fernando Ayala, David Jose Kohon, Simon Feldman and Fernando "Pino" Solanas, who began by making La Hora de los Hornos ("Hour of the Furnaces", 1966–68) the first documentaries on the political unrest in late-1960s Argentina (at great risk to himself).The movie combines new and old film footage to explain the history of Argentina and the wave of revolutionary fervor that swept many countries in Latin America. From the Spanish invaders to modern military concerns financed by foreign powers, this feature examines racism, social upheaval, native massacres and the precarious political situations that could change in the wake of revolutionary rebellion. This outstanding documentary launched the Third Cinema movement and put Latin American cinema on the international map. 

Directors such as Tulio Demicheli and Carlos Schlieper began to emerge who often both wrote and directed them. A second generation that achieved a cinematographic style were José A. Martínez Suárez, Manuel Antín and Leonardo Favio.

1960s and 1970s

The trend towards Ciné Vérité so evident in France in the early 1970s found an Argentine exponent in stage director Sergio Renán. His 1974 crime drama La tregua ("The Truce"), his first foray into film, was nominated for an Oscar. The same year, Osvaldo Bayer cooperated with the Province of Santa Cruz to make La patagonia rebelde as an homage to a violently quelled 1922 sheephands' strike.

Nostalgia was captured by Leopoldo Torre Nilsson, whose reworking of Argentine literary classics like The Hand in the Trap (1961), Martin Fierro (1968), The Seven Lunatics (1973) and Painted Lips (1974) earned him a cult following. Similar in atmosphere, Jose Martinez Suarez's moody Los muchachos de antes no usaban arsenico ("Older Men Don't Need Arsenic", 1975) takes a turn at murder worthy of Alfred Hitchcock. It was memorable as Mario Soffici's last role.

"During the early 1970's, Argentina came apart. Government repression was met by insurrections and terrorism. Solanas and Getino contributed by filming two documentary interviews with the exiled Peron. They also founded a magazine, Cine y liberacion. Getino directed El Familiar (1972), an allegorical fiction feature on the destiny of Latin America. Other film makers continued to make Peronist films, and ultra-left groups such as Cine de Base emerged."
"In 1976, this period of militant documentary and cinematic innovation was violently ruptured by the murder/disappearance of three documentary filmmakers by the Argentine military: Gleyzer, Pablo Szir and Enrique Juarez."

Heavily censored from 1975 until about 1980, Argentine film-makers generally limited themselves to light-hearted subjects. Among the productions during that era was Héctor Olivera's adaptation of Roberto Cossa's play, La nona (Grandma, 1979). The dark comedy became a reference to the foreign debt interest payments that later saddled the Argentine economy. One director who, even as a supporter of the military regime, delved into middle-class neuroses with frankness was Fernando Siro, an inventive film-maker seemingly insensitive to many of his colleagues' tribulations, many of whom were forced to leave during the dictatorship. Though his attitudes distanced him from his peers and public, his 1981 tragedy Venido a menos ("Dilapidated") continues to be influential.

Early 1980s
Following a loosening of restrictions in 1980, muck-raking cinema began to make itself evident on the Argentine screen. Plunging head-long into subjects like corruption and impunity (without directly indicting those in power), Adolfo Aristarain's Tiempo de revancha ("Time for Revenge", 1981), Fernando Ayala's Plata dulce ("Sweet Money," 1982) and Eduardo Calcagno's Los enemigos ("The Enemies," 1983) took hard looks at labor rights abuses, corporate corruption and the day's prevailing climate of fear at a time when doing so was often perilous. Petty corruption was also brought up in Fernando Ayala's El Arreglo ("The Deal," 1983).

Post junta cinema
A new era in Argentine cinema started after the arrival of democracy in 1983; besides a few memorable exceptions like Alejandro Doria's family comedy Esperando la carroza ("Waiting for the Hearse", 1985), the era saw a marked decline in the popularity of slapstick comedies towards films with more serious undertones and subject matter.

The first group deals frankly with the repression, torture and the disappearances during the Dirty War in the 1970s and early 1980s. They include: Hector Olivera's Funny Little Dirty War (1983) and the true story Night of the Pencils (1986); Luis Puenzo's Academy Award-winning The Official Story (1985); "Pino" Solanas' Tangos (1985) and Sur ("South", 1987) and Alejandro Doria's harrowing Sofia (1987), among others.

Among films dealing with past abuses, one German-Argentine co-production that also deserves mention is Jeanine Meerapfel's The Girlfriend (1988), where Norwegian leading lady Liv Ullmann is cast beside locals Federico Luppi, Cipe Lincovski, Victor Laplace and Lito Cruz.

A second group of films includes portrayals of exile and homesickness, like Alberto Fischermann's Los días de junio ("Days in June," 1985) and Juan Jose Jusid's Made in Argentina (1986), as well as plots rich in subtext, like Miguel Pereira's Verónico Cruz (1988), Gustavo Mosquera's Lo que vendrá ("The Near Future", 1988) and a cult favorite, Martin Donovan's English-language Apartment Zero (1988). These used metaphor, life's imponderables and hints at wider socio-political issues to reconcile audiences with recent events.

This can also be said of treatments of controversial literature and painful 19th century history like Maria Luisa Bemberg's Camila (1984), Carlos Sorin's A King and His Movie (1985) and Eliseo Subiela's Man Facing Southeast (1986).

Contemporary cinema

1990s

The 1990s brought another New Argentine Cinema wave, marked by classical cinema and a twist from Independent Argentine Production.

In 1991, Marco Bechis' Alambrado ("Chicken Wire") was released. That same year, activist film-maker Fernando "Pino" Solanas released his third major film, The Journey (1992), a surreal overview of prevailing social conditions in Latin America. Existential angst continued to dominate the Argentine film agenda, however, with Eliseo Subiela's El lado oscuro del corazon ("Dark Side of the Heart," 1992) and Adolfo Aristarain's A Place in the World (1992) – notable also for its having been nominated for an Oscar.

Later in the 1990s, the focus began to shift towards Argentina's mounting social problems, such as rising homelessness and crime. Alejandro Agresti's Buenos Aires vice versa (1996) rescued the beauty of feelings in the shadows of poverty in Buenos Aires and Bruno Stagnaro's Pizza, Beer, and Cigarettes (1997) looked into the human duality of even the most incorrigible and violent individuals.

Having an intense past and rich cultural heritage to draw on, directors continued to reach back with moody period pieces like Eduardo Mignogna's Flop  (1990), Maria Luisa Bemberg's De eso no se habla ("You Don't Discuss Certain Things," 1993, her last and one of Italian leading man's Marcello Mastroianni's last roles, as well), Santiago Oves' rendition of Rodolfo Walsh's Agatha Christie-esque tale Asesinato a distancia ("Murder from a Distance," 1998), as well as bio-pics like Leonardo Favio's Raging Bull-esque Gatica, el mono (1993) and Javier Torre's Lola Mora (1996).

Political history was re-examined with films like Eduardo Calcagno's controversial take on 1970s-era Argentine film censor Paulino Tato (played by Argentina's most prolific character actor, Ulises Dumont) in El Censor (1995), Juan J. Jusid's indictment of the old compulsory military training system, Bajo Bandera ("At Half Mast," 1997), Marco Bechis' Garage Olimpo (1999), which took viewers into one of the dictatorship's most brutal torture dungeons and Juan Carlos Desanzo's answer to Madonna's Evita, his 1996 Eva Perón (a portrait of a far more complex first lady than the one Andrew Lloyd Webber had taken up).

Popular culture had its turn on the Argentine screen. Alejandro Doria's Cien veces no debo ("I Don't Owe You Forever," 1990) took an irreverent peek into a typical middle-class Argentine home, Jose Santiso's De mi barrio con amor ("From My Neighborhood, with Love," 1996) is a must-see for anyone planning to visit Buenos Aires' bohemian southside and Rodolfo Pagliere's El día que Maradona conoció a Gardel ("The Day Maradona Met Gardel," 1996) is an inventive ode to two standards of Argentine culture.

2000s

Films such as Fabian Bielinsky's twister Nine Queens (2000), his gothic El Aura (2005) and Juan José Campanella's teary Son of the Bride (2001) have received praise and awards around the world. Juan Carlos Desanzo cast Miguel Ángel Solá (best known for his role in Tango) as the immortal Jorge Luis Borges in El Amor y el Espanto ("Love and Foreboding", 2001), a look at the writer's struggles with Perón-era intimidation as well as with his own insecurities.

Always politically active, Argentine film continues to treat hard subjects, like Spanish director Manane Rodríguez's look at abducted children, The Lost Steps (2001) and "Pino" Solanas' perhaps definitive film on the 2001 economic crisis, Memorias del saqueo ("Memories of the Riot", 2004). Tristán Bauer took audiences back to soldiers' dehumanizing Falklands War experience with Blessed by Fire (2005) and Adrián Caetano follows four football players through their 1977 escape from certain death in Chronicle of an Escape (2006).

Lucrecia Martel's 2001 debut feature film La ciénaga ("The Swamp"), about an indulgent bourgeois extended family spending the summertime in a decrepit vacation home in Salta, was internationally highly acclaimed upon release and introduced a new and vital voice to Argentine cinema. For film scholar David Oubiña, it is "one of the highest achievements" of the New Argentine Cinema, coincidentally timed with Argentina's political and economic crisis that it "became a rare expression of an extremely troubled moment in the nation's recent history. It is a masterpiece of singular maturity". Martel's succeeding films would also receive further international acclaim, such as the adolescent drama The Holy Girl (2004), the psychological thriller The Headless Woman (2008), and the period drama adaptation Zama (2017).

Responding to its sentimental public, Argentine film at times returns to subjects of the heart. David Lipszyc's grainy portrait of depression-era Argentina, El astillero ("The Shipyard", 2000) was a hit with critics, Paula Hernandez's touching ode to immigrants, Inheritance (2001), has become something of a sleeper, Adolfo Aristarain's Common Places (2002) follows an elderly professor into retirement, Cleopatra (2003), Eduardo Mignona's tale of an unlikely friendship, received numerous awards, as did Carlos Sorín's touching El perro ("The Dog", 2004). Emotional negativity, a staple for filmmakers anywhere, was explored in Mario Sabato's India Pravile (2003), Francisco D'Intino's La esperanza (2005) and Ariel Rotter's El otro ("The Other", 2007) each deals with mid-life crises in very different ways. The pronounced sentimentality of the average Argentine was also the subject of Robert Duvall's 2002 Assassination Tango, a deceptively simple crime drama that shows that still waters do, indeed, run deep.

Buffeted by years of economic malaise and encroachment of the domestic film market by foreign (mainly, US) titles, the Argentine film industry has been supported by the 1987 creation of the National Institute of Cinema and Audioviual Arts (INCAA), a publicly subsidized film underwriter that, since 1987, has produced 130 full-length art house titles.

The decade ended on a high with the 2009 film The Secret in Their Eyes receiving critical praise, winning the Oscar for Best Foreign Language Film at the 82nd Academy Awards, three weeks after being awarded the Goya Award for Best Spanish Language Foreign Film of 2009.

2010s
In 2014, the anthology film Wild Tales (Relatos Salvajes in Spanish) directed by Damián Szifron was nominated for the Best Foreign Language Film at the 87th Academy Awards and won the Goya Award for Best Iberoamerican Film.

Argentine films
For an A-Z list of Argentine films currently on Wikipedia see :Category:Argentine films.
For a timeline of Argentine films see List of Argentine films

Argentine film companies
EMB Entertainment, Corp. / Contrakultura
Aleph Producciones
Aqua Films
Argentina Sono Film
BD Cine
INCAA
Patagonik Film Group
Pol-ka

Argentine scenographers
Saulo Benavente

See also

The 100 Greatest Films of Argentine Cinema
Cinema of the world
Argentine Academy of Cinematography Arts and Sciences Awards
Argentine Film Critics Association Awards
Buenos Aires International Independent Film Festival
Cinenacional.com
Clarín Awards
Grupo Cine Liberación
Mar del Plata International Film Festival
World cinema

References

External links
Buenos Aires Blues: Five Must-See Argentine Films
Cineargentino
Argentine Cinema Awards
Brief Argentine Cinema History
Argentine Documentary Cinema
Official promotion portal for argentine cinema  (Spanish)
History of the Argentine independent cinema (Spanish)
History of the cinema in Argentina at INCAA. (In Spanish)

 
Argentine culture
Industry in Argentina